Grigorovo is a rural locality (a selo) in Lyakhovskoye Rural Settlement, Melenkovsky District, Vladimir Oblast, Russia. The population was 60 as of 2010. There are 2 streets.

Geography 
Grigorovo is located 24 km east of Melenki (the district's administrative centre) by road. Korikovo is the nearest rural locality.

References 

Rural localities in Melenkovsky District
Melenkovsky Uyezd